Partito Socialista is Italian for "Socialist Party" and may refer to:

 Socialist Party (San Marino) (PS), 2012–date
 Socialist Party (Italy, 1996) (PS), 1996–2001, led by Ugo Intini and Gianni De Michelis
 Socialist Party (Italy, 2007) (PS), founded in 2007 by the merger of six minor social-democratic parties and subsequently renamed Italian Socialist Party (Italian: , PSI)

The term may also refer to:

Italian Socialist Party (Italian: , PSI), 1892–1994
Reformist Socialist Party (Italian: , PSR), 1994–1996, led by Enrico Manca and Fabrizio Cicchitto
Sammarinese Socialist Party (Italian: , PSS), 1892–2005
Social Democratic Party of Switzerland, 1888–date

See also 
 Socialist Party (disambiguation)